This is a list of notable buildings associated with the Woodmen of the World (WOW).

The organization formerly owned a 19-story tower at 14th and Farnam Streets which was the tallest building between Chicago and the West coast at the time of its dedication in 1912.  WOW built its current 30-story Woodmen Tower in 1969. It was Omaha's tallest building until the completion of the 45-story First National Bank Tower in 2002.  The original WOW building was demolished in 1977.  Also there are many buildings in which Woodmen of the World chapters met, and some of these are notable buildings.

in the United States (ordered by state then city)

See also
Modern Woodmen Park, Davenport, Iowa, a baseball stadium named for Modern Woodmen of America
Woodmen of Union Building, Hot Springs, Arkansas, NRHP-listed on Bathhouse Row
Modern Woodmen of America Hall, a National Register of Historic Places listing in Brown County, South Dakota
Melody Ballroom, Portland, Oregon, corporate headquarters of Woodmen of the World built in 1925.

References